Taylor v. United States may refer to several United States Supreme Court cases:
 John Taylor v. United States (1832) 44 U.S. 197 (1832)
 Taylor v. United States (1973), 414 U.S. 17 (1973)
 Arthur Lajuane Taylor v. United States 495 U.S. 575 (1990), on sentencing enhancements
 Taylor v. United States, 579 U.S. ___ (2016), on the Hobbs Act.